The Hudson Museum is an anthropology museum that is operated by the University of Maine and is located in the Collins Center for the Arts in Orono, Maine.  The museum's collections include Maine Native American baskets and basket-making tools, Precolumbian ceramics, weapons and gold work, and baskets, jewelry, ceramics, textiles, clothing, tools, weapons and contemporary art from Native American peoples around the United States and the Arctic area.

References

External links
Hudson Museum

Museums in Penobscot County, Maine
University museums in Maine
Native American museums in Maine
Pre-Columbian art museums in the United States
Buildings and structures at the University of Maine
1986 establishments in Maine
Museums established in 1986